Cicadulina mbila, the maize leafhopper, is a leafhopper species in the genus Cicadulina.

It is found in sub-Saharan Africa (Kenya, Tanzania and Uganda), the Middle East, West Asia and India. It is one of the vectors of the maize streak virus.

References

External links 

 Fact sheet at eafrinet/maize_pests

Macrostelini
Insects described in 1924
Insect vectors of plant pathogens
Insects of the Middle East
Insects of India
Insect pests of millets